Elise Frances Harmon (née Harmon; 3 September 1909 in Mount Enterprise, Texas – 6 March 1985 in Santa Clara County, California) was an American physicist, chemist, and influential contributor to the miniaturization of computers.

Early life and education 
Around 1927, Harmon graduated from Marshall High School in Marshall, Texas.

In 1931, Harmon earned a Bachelor of Science in Chemistry from University of North Texas. In June 1930, while a student, she was elected president of the W.N. Masters Chemical Society, a student organization she joined as a freshman in 1927, sponsored by Wallace Newton Masters (1864–1943), founder of the Chemistry Department in 1910.

Harmon earned a Master of Science from the University of Texas at Austin.

Harmon did post-graduate work at George Washington University and the University of Maryland.

Career highlights 
 Research
During World War II, she worked in the United States Naval Research Laboratory's Aircraft and Electrical Division. In the early 1950, Harmon worked for the Bureau of Standards and the Naval Research Bureau in Washington, D.C.  In 1953, she became chief research printed circuit engineer for the Aerovox Corporation, headquartered at Plant 2 in New Bedford, Massachusetts.  At the time, she had the responsibility of directing the research and development, as well as establishing plant procedures for new methods of printed circuitry and printed circuit components.  In the 1970s, she was head of Aerovox Corporation's printed circuit activities. She was a member of the American Chemical Society, the Institute of Radio Engineers, and the Texas Academy of Science.

One of Harmon's major contributions to the field was the development of a hot die stamp method to create printed circuits in which silver conductors were infused on thermoplastics and thermosetting materials.  She and Philip J. Franklin (né Philip Jacquins Franklin; 1909–1979) were awarded a patent in 1953 for this technological breakthrough.  Harmon also researched the action of grease and lubricants in high speed bearings and established the pilot plant procedures for an entirely new method of printed circuitry.

 Teaching
Harmon taught chemistry, physics, and biology at the Brownsville Junior High School from about 1934 to 1937.  She later taught those subjects at Texas Junior College, the University of North Texas, and University of Texas at Austin.

Memberships and affiliations 
 American Chemical Society — Harmon became a member in 1950
 Institute of Radio Engineers
 Texas Academy of Sciences

Awards 
 1956, Harmon was awarded the Society of Women Engineers Achievement Award for her specialty in printed circuits.
 1968, Harmon was awarded the IPC President's Award, honoring those who made the most significant contributions to IPC programs during the term of office of each departing IPC president

Selected published works 
 "Fabrication of Multilayer Boards at Autonetics for Minuteman II Program," by Elise F. Harmon, Anaheim, California: North American Aviation / Autonetics (1965); 
 Presented at the Multilayer Seminar, sponsored by Milton S. Kiver Publications, Inc. (Milton Sol Kiver; 1918–2005), and Electronic Packaging and Production (magazine), New York, New York, March 22–25, 1965

 "Method of Making a Photosensitive Solder Maskant," United States Department of the Air Force, Fort Belvoir Defense Technical Information Center, December 21, 1973; 
 "Sliding Contacts at High Altitudes, Experimental System for Carbon Brush Investigations," PB129176 (U.S. Publications Board Number), by E.F. Harmon, E-3176 (NRL Formal Report Number), September 1947 (date of report)
 Bibliography of Unclassified NRL Formal Reports Numbers 1000 to 5700, U.S. Naval Research Laboratory, July 1962, pg. 52;

Selected patents 
She held numerous patents including, ones for:
 1953 US 2656570 A: "Plastic Matrix for Printing Resistors" (hot die stamp method of infusing silver conductors on polymerized materials)
 1953 US 2844172 A: "Silk Screen Stretcher" (mechanism for stretching fabric to obtain uniform tautness)
 Injection printing machine for film resistors
 Improved high altitude carbon brush performance, enabling American airplanes to maintain superiority during WWII

Death 
Harmon died March 6, 1985, in Santa Clara County, California, while a resident of Redwood City, California.  She is buried in Section P, Block 35, Grave 1 of the IOOF Cemetery, Denton, Texas, next to her mother, Geoffie Harmon (1887–1931), in Grave 2, and brother, Hamlett Stephen Harmon (1913–1997), in Grave 3.  The three grave sites were purchased in 1931 by her father, George Herbert Harmon (1881–1957).

Family 
Harmon had a brother and a sister. Her brother Ham Harmon, played professional football with the Chicago Cardinals in 1937 for one season. Her sister Ann Ferrari, participated in the Salk Polio Vaccine field trail, and served as Instructor of Physical Therapy at Stanford.

Further resources 
 "Harmon, Elise F.," Society of Women Engineers National Records, Walter P. Reuther Library, Wayne State University, Box 189
 "Autumn Stanley Papers," Iowa State University, Special Collections, Box 77, Folder 64, Dates: 1953–2003

References 
Patents
Official Gazette of the United States Patent Office:

 Inline citations

1909 births
1985 deaths
20th-century American physicists
Women inventors
People from Rusk County, Texas
University of North Texas alumni
University of Texas at Austin alumni
20th-century American women scientists
20th-century American chemists
20th-century American inventors